Buck Mountain is a small mountain located in the Pine Hills standing at , making it the tallest summit in the range. It is 19 miles from Miles City, MT and ten miles from the Strawberry Hill Recreation Area.

Mountains of Custer County, Montana